The Chaudry is an albino breed of domestic rabbit that originated in France and was developed for meat production.

See also

List of rabbit breeds

References

Rabbit breeds
Rabbit breeds originating in France